Cherugudi Sukshmapureeswarar Temple
(செருகுடி சூட்சுமபுரீசுவரர் கோயில்
])is a Hindu temple located at Cherugudi in Tiruvarur district, Tamil Nadu, India. The presiding deity is Shiva. He is called as Sukshma Pureeswarar. His consort is known as Mangala Nayaki.

Significance 

It is one of the shrines of the 275 Paadal Petra Sthalams - Shiva Sthalams glorified in the early medieval Tevaram poems by Tamil Saivite Nayanar Tirugnanasambandar.

Literary mention 
Tirugnanasambandar describes the feature of the deity as:

References

External links

Photogallery

Shiva temples in Tiruvarur district
Padal Petra Stalam